Down with the King is the sixth studio album by American hip hop group Run-D.M.C., released on May 4, 1993, by Profile Records. The album was produced by Pete Rock, Q-Tip, EPMD, DJ Kay Gee of Naughty by Nature, Jam Master Jay, The Bomb Squad, Daniel Shulman, Run-D.M.C., Chyskills, Jermaine Dupri and Clifton "Specialist" Dillon.

Showcasing their evolving style, this innovative album boasted invited guests, including reggae star Mad Cobra and Rage Against the Machine guitarist Tom Morello. The album features guest appearances from rappers Pete Rock & C.L. Smooth, Q-Tip, EPMD and Onyx. Down with the King was generally received more favorably by fans and critics than the group's previous album, Back from Hell.

Thanks to the title track, the album was certified Gold by the RIAA after only two months, July 20, 1993. Down with the King peaked at number 7 on the US Billboard 200, and number 1 on the Top R&B/Hip Hop Albums chart.

The album features three Billboard singles: "Down with the King", "Ooh, Whatcha Gonna Do" and "Can I Get It, Yo". The title track also hit the UK Singles Chart.

The album was reissued by Arista Records in 1999 and 2003.

Background 
With the release of the new album, Run-D.M.C. created a new look: All black Walker Wear outfits, black Timberlands and bald heads. DMC replaced traditional glasses with contact lenses and began to wear around his neck a large black wooden cross. Run started wearing sunglasses. Jay began to wear a designer ski hat by April Walker to cover his own bald head.

The album was recorded and mixed at 9 studios in New York City and at 1 studio in Atlanta ("Can I Get A Witness").

Critical response 

The album received positive reviews. Jason Lymangrover from AllMusic said "The new sound is decidedly more fashionable, and their fedoras and Adidas are abandoned here for bald heads and baggy black hoodies to match their new gangsta musical direction; which takes an obvious cue from Onyx (signed to Jam Master Jay's label), whose "Slam" was a platinum hit earlier in 1993."

Rolling Stone (6/24/93, p. 83) gave Down with the King three and a half stars out of five, saying "...straight-faced and ultraconfident, funky and forthright...[has] the same infectious enthusiasm and the same in-your-face attitude as Run-DMC's raw earlier classics..."

Entertainment Weekly (5/7/93, p. 56) gave the album "B", saying "...they still manage to sound young, lean, and hungry after 10 years in the rap game...."

Gil Griffin from The Washington Post praised the album by saying:

Videos 
Two video clips were released on songs from the album: "Down With The King" and "Ooh, Whatcha Gonna Do". In the video on the title track, which was directed by Marcus Raboy, a lot of rap stars were filmed: Eazy-E, Redman, Kris Kross, Jermaine Dupri, Phife Dawg, Onyx, Salt-n-Pepa, KRS-One, EPMD, A Tribe Called Quest, De La Soul, MC Lyte, Kid Capri, Das EFX, P.M. Dawn and Naughty by Nature. Onyx also appeared in the video for the song "Ooh, Whatcha Gonna Do".

Track listing 
The information about samples was taken from WhoSampled.

Charts

Weekly charts

Singles

Certifications

See also
 List of number-one R&B albums of 1993 (U.S.)
 Run-D.M.C. - Born Again: Interview in The Source (February 1993)
 Run-D.M.C. - Don't Call It a Comeback: Interview in Hip-Hop Connection Magazine (April 1993)
 Run-D.M.C. - A Day In The Studio with Run-D.M.C.: Interview in Rap Sheet Magazine (June 1993)
 Making a Difference: Run-D.M.C. and Guru of Gang Starr in Conversation (October 1993)

References

External links 
 Down with the King at Discogs
 Down with the King at RapGenius

Run-DMC albums
1993 albums
Profile Records albums
Albums produced by Jermaine Dupri
Albums produced by Pete Rock
Albums produced by Q-Tip (musician)
Albums produced by KayGee
Albums produced by Erick Sermon